Luis Ramón Garrido Esquivel (born 10 May 1996) is a Mexican badminton player from Monterrey, Nuevo León. He competed at the 2014 Summer Youth Olympics in Nanjing, China.

Achievements

BWF International Challenge/Series (8 titles, 2 runners-up) 
Men's singles

Men's doubles

  BWF International Challenge tournament
  BWF International Series tournament
  BWF Future Series tournament

References

External links 
 

1996 births
Living people
Sportspeople from Monterrey
Mexican male badminton players
Badminton players at the 2014 Summer Youth Olympics